Baix Llobregat is a comarca (county) on the coast of Catalonia, Spain. Its capital is Sant Feliu de Llobregat.

Municipalities

Proposed changes
It has long been proposed to split the northern part of Baix Llobregat into a separate comarca. Recent campaigns have referred to the proposed new comarca as "Montserratí", due to the landmark Montserrat mountain marking part of its eastern border.

References

External links 
Official web site of the Consell Comarcal del Baix Llobregat (in Catalan)
Data, on the site of the Generalitat de Catalunya
Artistic and historical buildings in Baix Llobregat (in Catalan)

 
Comarques of the Province of Barcelona